Fayetteville Township is one of thirty-seven townships in Washington County, Arkansas, USA.  The township had a population of 73,580 at the 2010 Census. The township contains the City of Fayetteville in its entirety, as the township and the city have identical boundaries.

Geography
The boundaries of Fayetteville Township are identical to the City of Fayetteville, which has taken from its neighboring township many times. As a result of the expansion of Fayetteville, the boundaries have become gerrymandered and follow the major routes as they leave town.

Neighborhoods
Baldwin
Barbara (historical)
Fayette Junction
McNair
Rucker's Grove (historical)
White Rock

Cemeteries
The township contains eleven cemeteries:

Major routes

See also
 University of Arkansas
 Dickson Street

References

 United States Census Bureau 2008 TIGER/Line Shapefiles
 United States National Atlas

External links
 US-Counties.com
 City-Data.com

Townships in Washington County, Arkansas
Townships in Arkansas